Porte Saint-Honoré was a city gate in Paris. There were three gates that bore the name, demolished rebuilt further and further along rue Saint-Honoré as the city expanded - they dated to the early 13th, late 14th and early 17th centuries.

Bibliography
Jacques Hillairet, Connaissance du vieux Paris : rive droite, rive gauche, les îles & les villages, Paris, éditions Payot & Rivages, 1993 (1re éd. 1956), 3 t. en 1 vol. , 377-299-255 p..
Renaud Gagneux and Denis Prouvost, Sur les traces des enceintes de Paris : promenade au long des murs disparus, Paris, éditions Parigramme, 2004, 246 p..

Saint-Honore
Buildings and structures in the 1st arrondissement of Paris
Former buildings and structures in Paris